Deoxidization is a method used in metallurgy to remove the oxygen content during steel manufacturing.  In contrast, antioxidants are used for stabilization, such as in the storage of food.  Deoxidation is important in the steelmaking process as oxygen is often detrimental to the quality of steel produced.  Deoxidization is mainly achieved by adding a separate chemical species to neutralize the effects of oxygen or by directly removing the oxygen.

Oxidation 
Oxidation is the process of an element losing electrons.  For example, iron will transfer two of its electrons to oxygen, forming an oxide.  This occurs all throughout as an unintended part of the steelmaking process.

Oxygen blowing is a method of steelmaking where oxygen is blown through pig iron to lower the carbon content.  Oxygen forms oxides with the unwanted elements, such as carbon, silicon, phosphorus, and manganese, which appear from various stages of the manufacturing process.  These oxides will float to the top of the steel pool and remove themselves from the pig iron.  However, some of the oxygen will also react with the iron itself.

Due to the high temperatures involved in smelting, oxygen in the air may dissolve into the molten iron while it is being poured.  Slag, a byproduct left over after the smelting process, is used to further absorb impurities such as sulfur or oxides and protect steel from further oxidation. However, it can still be responsible for some oxidation.

Some processes, while still able to lead to oxidation, are not relevant to the oxygen content of steel during its manufacture.  For example, rust is a red iron oxide that forms when the iron in steel reacts with the oxygen or water in the air.  This usually only occurs once the steel has been in use for varying lengths of time.  Some physical components of the steelmaking process itself, such as the electric arc furnace, may also wear down and oxidize.  This problem is typically dealt with by the use of refractory metals, which resist environmental conditions.

If steel is not properly deoxidized, it will have lost various properties such as tensile strength, ductility, toughness, weldability, polishability, and machinability.  This is due to forming non-metallic inclusions and gas pores, bubbles of gas that get trapped during the solidification process of steel.

Types of deoxidizers

Metallic deoxidizers 
This method of deoxidization involves adding specific metals into the steel.  These metals will react with the unwanted oxygen, forming a strong oxide that, compared to pure oxygen, will reduce the steel's strength and qualities by a lesser amount.

The chemical equation for deoxidization is represented by:

where n and m are coefficients, D is the deoxidizing agent, and O is oxygen.

Thus, the chemical equilibrium equation involved is:

where aox is the activity, or concentration, of the oxide in the steel,
aD is the activity of the deoxidizing agent,
and aO is the activity of the oxygen.

An increase in the equilibrium constant Keq will cause an increase in aox, and thus more of the oxide product.

Keq can be manipulated by the steel temperature via the following equation:

where AD and BD are parameters specific to different deoxidizers and T is the temperature in K°.  Below are the values for certain deoxidizers at a temperature of 1873 K°.

Below is a list of commonly used metallic deoxidizers:
 Ferrosilicon, ferromanganese, calcium silicide - used in steelmaking in production of carbon steels, stainless steels, and other ferrous alloys
 Manganese - used in steelmaking
 Silicon carbide, calcium carbide - used as ladle deoxidizer in steel production
 Aluminum dross - also a ladle deoxidizer, used in secondary steelmaking
 Calcium - used as a deoxidizer, desulfurizer, or decarbonizer for ferrous and non-ferrous alloys
 Titanium - used as a deoxidizer for steels
 Phosphorus, copper(I) phosphide - used in production of oxygen-free copper
 Calcium hexaboride - used in production of oxygen-free copper, yields higher conductivity copper than phosphorus-deoxidized
 Yttrium - used to deoxidize vanadium and other non-ferrous metals
 Zirconium
 Magnesium
 Carbon
 Tungsten

Vacuum deoxidation 
Vacuum deoxidation is a method which involves using a vacuum to remove impurities.  A portion of the carbon and oxygen in steel will react, forming carbon monoxide.  CO gas will float up to the top of the liquid steel and be removed by a vacuum system.

As the chemical reaction involved in vacuum deoxidation is:

the reaction between carbon and oxygen is represented by the following chemical equilibrium equation:

where PCO is the partial pressure of the carbon monoxide formed.

Decreasing the oxygen activity(aO) will result in a higher equilibrium constant, thus more product, CO.  To achieve this, subjecting the pool of steel to vacuum treatment decreases the value of PCO, allowing for more CO gas to be produced.

Diffusion deoxidation 
This method relies on the idea that deoxidation of slag will lead to the deoxidation of steel.

The chemical equilibrium equation used for this process is:

where a[O] is the activity of the oxygen in the slag, and a(O) is the activity of oxygen in the steel.

Reducing the activity in the slag (a[O]) will lower the oxygen levels in the slag.  Afterwards, oxygen will diffuse from the steel into the lesser concentrated slag.  This method is done by using deoxidizing agents on the slag, such as coke or silicon.  As these agents do not come into direct contact with the steel, non-metallic inclusions will not form in the steel itself.

References

See also 
 Desulfurization is the process of decreasing the sulfur content of steel.
 Decarburization is the process of decreasing the carbon content in metallurgy.
 Deoxidized steels are steels categorized by level of deoxidization treatment.
 Vacuum engineering
 Vacuum metallurgy

Industrial processes
Metallurgy
Steelmaking